Bactrianoscythris annae is a moth of the family Scythrididae. It was described by Pietro Passerin d'Entrèves and Angela Roggero in 2009. It is found in Afghanistan.

References

Bactrianoscythris
Moths described in 2009